The following lists events that happened during 1878 in Chile.

Incumbents
President of Chile: Aníbal Pinto

Events

December
December - Chile dispatches a warship to Antofagasta.

Births
17 June - Agustín Edwards Mac-Clure (d. 1941)
6 July - Marmaduke Grove (d. 1954)

Deaths
8 June - Rafael Valentín Valdivieso (b. 1804)

References 

 
Years of the 19th century in Chile
Chile